Close to the Silence was the debut album by the Nashville, Tennessee-based band Llama.  It was recorded in Nashville over a two-year period while the three original members of the band (Ben Morton, Neil Mason, and Ben Brown) were finishing high school. One song from the album, "Too Much Too Soon," (which features Béla Fleck) was included on the soundtrack to the 2002 film Swimfan.  "Too Much Too Soon" also appeared in the 2002 film Van Wilder.

Track listing
"Back Where We Began" (Ben Morton, Kenny Greenberg, Matt Rollings) – 3:07
"Three White Cars (Morton) – 3:49
"Hero" (Morton, Greenberg, Rollings) – 4:05
"Too Much Too Soon" (Morton) – 3:37
"Close To The Silence" (Morton, Neil Mason) – 3:28
"All You Ever Wanted" (Morton, Greenberg, Rollings) – 4:12
"Fruit" (Morton, Greenberg, Rollings) – 3:22
"Chasing The Sun" (Morton, Mason, Greenberg, Rollings) – 4:07
"Another Round" (Morton) – 4:23
"Carry Me High" (Morton) – 3:27
"To Believe" (Morton) – 12:35 (Contains hidden track called "Space Love")

Credits
Ben Brown – electric guitar
Neil Mason – drums
Ben Morton – vocals, acoustic guitar
James SK Wān – bamboo flute

References 

Llama (band) albums
2001 debut albums
MCA Records albums
Albums produced by Kenny Greenberg